3,3,-Diphenylcyclobutanamine is a psychostimulant drug which was originally prepared as an antidepressant in the late 1970s. It appears to inhibit the reuptake of serotonin, norepinephrine, and dopamine, and may also induce their release as well. The N-methyl and N,N-dimethyl analogues of the compound are also known and are more potent. All three agents produce locomotor stimulation in animal studies, with the tertiary amine being the strongest.

Synthesis
A number of methods were tried in order to construct the strained four-carbon ring. A synthesis of 3,3-diphenylcyclobutanone
appeared in the literature. The ketone was prepared in low yield by the reaction of diphenylketene with 2 equiv of diazomethane. The latter synthesis, although low yielding, was used and the desired amines were prepared from 3,3-diphenylcyclobutanone.

Diphenylketene
Diphenylketene is produced by the elimination of hydrogen chloride from diphenylacetyl chloride in the presence of triethylamine.

See also 
 β-Phenylmethamphetamine
 Fezolamine
 Azetidine ring variation:

References 

Amines
Antidepressants
Stimulants
Cyclobutanes
Benzhydryl compounds